Elysium (also known as 54 Clarke) was a proposed residential skyscraper to be located in the Southbank precinct of Melbourne, Victoria, Australia. Despite receiving planning approval in 2013, the proposed skyscraper was scrapped in 2019.

The project was developed by the Melbourne-based Matrix & Cube group and designed by BKK Architects. Rising to a height of 243.8 metres (800 feet), Elysium would have contained up to 288 residential apartments, across 75 levels; this would have made it one of the tallest buildings in Melbourne. Its design was notable for a slender appearance – with a width of 12 metres (39 feet) at its narrowest – which had earned it a reputation for being one of the "skinniest skyscraper (proposals)" in Melbourne.

First proposed in 2011, Elysium received approval twice in 2013 by then-Planning Minister Matthew Guy; initially in February, 2013, which was later challenged through Victorian Civil and Administrative Tribunal (VCAT), and then subsequently in December, 2013. In 2019, the proposed skyscraper was cancelled, with plans resubmitted for a high-rise residential building of 24 levels.

References 

Skyscrapers in Melbourne
Residential skyscrapers in Australia
Apartment buildings in Melbourne
Proposed skyscrapers in Australia